The Men's individual pursuit events at the 2012 Summer Paralympics took place on 30 August–1 September at London Velopark.

Classification
Cyclists are given a classification depending on the type and extent of their disability. The classification system allows cyclists to compete against others with a similar level of function. The class number indicates the severity of impairment with "1" being most impaired.

Pursuit cycling classes are:
B: Blind and visually impaired cyclists use a Tandem bicycle with a sighted pilot on the front
C 1-5: Cyclists with an impairment that affects their legs, arms and/or trunk but are capable of using a standard bicycle

B

The men's 4 km individual pursuit (B) took place on 30 August.

C1

The men's 3 km individual pursuit (C1) took place on 31 August.

C2

The men's 3 km individual pursuit (C2) took place on 31 August.

C3

The men's 3 km individual pursuit (C3) took place on 31 August.

C4

The men's 4 km individual pursuit (C4) took place on 1 September.

C5
The men's 4 km individual pursuit (C5) took place on 1 September.

References 

Men's individual pursuit